Hedvig Maria Tesch (1850–1936) was a Swedish professional photographer who had a studio in Linköping. As a result of her productive and highly successful business, thousands of her photographs remain in the collections of the local museum and county library.

Biography
Born in Eksjö in 1850, Tesch moved to Linköping in 1873 where she opened a studio in a building on the corner of Drottninggatan and Nygatan. It was so successful that a few years later she was able to buy the property. As a result of her increasingly well-known reputation, people from the city and its surroundings visited her for portraits which can still be found in many family albums. Thanks to her enormous capacity for work, Tesch was able to enlarge her premises, engage several employees and open a branch in Eksjö. One of her tricks in making good photographs was to get people to smile by shouting "Look happy, think of the one who's going to get the photograph," before she disappeared behind the black curtain. She ran the Linköping studio until 1917 when she ceded it to Anna Göransson.

By the time she died on 5 April 1936, Tesch had run up a considerable fortune. She left it to the Linköping Association for the Aged and to charities in Eksjö. Today thousands of her photographs are preserved in the local library and the Östergötland County Museum, where some of her equipment can also be seen.

References

Further reading

External links

 Photographs by Maria Tesch from Östergötlands Museum

1850 births
1936 deaths
People from Linköping
19th-century Swedish photographers
Swedish women photographers
19th-century women photographers